The Powell Street Festival is an ongoing annual festival in Paueru-Gai, Vancouver. Originating in 1977 the Powell Street Festival is the largest Japanese Canadian festival and the longest ongoing community event in Vancouver.  The festival takes place in and around Oppenheimer Park. The Festival takes place every BC Day long weekend, which usually lands around the beginning of August.

Powell Street Festival features both local, national, and international talent. It also features an outdoor venue with interactive installations, children's activities, craft market, martial arts demonstrations, taiko drumming, amateur sumo tournament, tea ceremonies, ikebana and bonsai demonstrations.

Artists, Performers, and Talent

Local / Lower Mainland 

 Mark Takeshi McGregor, flutist
 Kytami, violinist
 David Suzuki, environmentalist and activist
 Joy Kogawa, writer

National / Canadian 

 Teke::Teke, band, Montreal
 Diyet, folk musician, Yukon

International 

 Yuni Mori, pianist, Japan
 George and Noriko, musicians, Australia
 Katie Malia, comedian and filmmaker, Los Angeles, United States
 Jay Rubin, translator, Washington D.C, United States
 GRMLN, musician, California, United States

References

External links
 http://powellstreetfestival.com/
 http://www.boardoftrade.com/sov_page.asp?pageid=1380
 http://www.greatervancouverparks.com/JapanFest01.html
 http://www.harbourpublishing.com/book.php?id=259

Asian-Canadian culture in Vancouver
Cultural festivals in Canada
Festivals in Vancouver
International festivals
Japanese-Canadian culture